The Central Logistics Base is the main central logistics unit of the Serbian Armed Forces. It is under the direct command of the General Staff.

History
The 608th Rear Base, was formed on November 16, 1992, under direct command of the General Staff. The origins of 608th Rear Base date back to 1953, when Procurement Base for the Imported Materiel of Yugoslav People's Army was established. The base was transformed on 20 November 1961. In 1987 Technical-Supply Base of Yugoslav Ministry of Defence was formed.
Central Logistics Base was formed on 15 December 2006 with reorganization of 608th Rear Base and subordinating storage facilities of 793rd Rear Base as well as 524th and 201st Logistics base.

Tasks
The main task of Central Logistics Base is providing units and institutions of Serbian Armed Forces with basic moveable materiel and reserve parts, ordnance and fuels, quartermaster, medical and vet moveable supplies. It is also in charge of maintenance of special-purpose resources, ordnance and missiles, fuels and wiring.

Structure
Central Logistics Base comprises a total of 21 warehouses and 9 sections in 49 locations. It consists of command company and 4 battalions (including battalion-size 1st Logistics Center):
 Command company
 1st Logistics Center - Belgrade (Kneževac)
 1st Depot Battalion - Gornji Milanovac (Lunjevica)
 2nd Depot Battalion - Kragujevac
 3rd Depot Battalion - Niš
 2nd Retail Center - Niš

References

External links
Central Logistics Base Web Page

Military units and formations of the Serbian General Staff
Military units and formations established in 1992